Philippe Nkiere Keana is a retired Roman Catholic bishop in the Democratic Republic of the Congo.

He was born on 21 February 1938 in Bokoro. He was ordained as a priest in 1965 and as Coadjutor Bishop of Bondo in January 1992, becoming  Bishop of Bondo in November 1992.

Keana was appointed Bishop of Inongo in 2005 and retired in 2018. He was succeeded as Bishop of Inongo by Donatien Bafuidinsoni Maloko-Mana.

References 

1938 births
Roman Catholic bishops of Inongo
Roman Catholic bishops of Bondo
Democratic Republic of the Congo Roman Catholic bishops
Living people